Seekh kebab (Urdu: , Hindi: , Bengali: সিক কাবাব/ standard Bengali: শিক কাবাব) is a kebab made with spiced, minced meat, usually lamb, formed into cylinders on skewers and grilled, in India, Pakistan, Bangladesh and Afghanistan. It is typically cooked on a mangal or in a tandoor. In Bengali it is called Shik kabab

Description
Seekh kebabs are soft and succulent, seasoned with various spices such as ginger, garlic, green chilli pepper, powdered chilli and garam masala, as well as lemon juice, cilantro and mint leaves. Sometimes extra fats are added to further enhance the flavor. Seekh kebabs are typically served with raita, salad, onion slices, lemon wedges or green chutney and eaten with naan or paratha.

Popular seekh kebabs are the tunde ke kabab, kakori kebab and gilafi seekh kebab. Vegetarian seekh kebabs in India are made with beans, carrots, potatoes, cauliflowers and green peas.

See also
 Indian cuisine
 Bangladeshi cuisine/Bengali cuisine
 Pakistani cuisine
 Afghan cuisine
 Mughlai cuisine
 List of kebabs
 Kofte
 Sausage
 List of kebabs
 Kabab koobideh
 Şiş köfte
 Ćevapi
 Kebapche
 Adana kebabı

References

Afghan cuisine
Pakistani cuisine
Bangladeshi cuisine
Indian cuisine
Indo-Caribbean cuisine
Skewered kebabs
Meat dishes